Sacred Heart Catholic Church is located at 2206 Binney Street in the Kountze Place neighborhood of North Omaha, Nebraska within the Roman Catholic Archdiocese of Omaha.

Description
Built in 1902 in Late Gothic Revival style, the City of Omaha declared it a landmark in 1979, and it was listed on the National Register of Historic Places in 1983. 

Located in a historically African American neighborhood today, the church was originally constructed on land donated by Omaha real estate investor and banker Herman Kountze for his housing addition called Kountze Place.  
 A high-end streetcar suburb, Kountze Place was an all-white enclave for more than 50 years. White flight in the neighborhood began in 1936 with the imposition of Home Owners Loan Corporation funds diverting money from a neighboring African American neighborhood called the Omaha. This mass exodus of parishioners from the surrounding neighborhood left Sacred Heart in a lurch, and the church became an open parish for members across the city. Today, the parish and its elementary school for neighborhood students continue thriving, along with a community outreach program and more.

The building continues serving the parish an has been recognized as an official Omaha Landmark.

See also
Architecture in North Omaha, Nebraska
Roman Catholic Archdiocese of Omaha
 List of churches in Omaha, Nebraska

References

External links

Sacred Heart parish website
Sacred Heart school website
"A History of the Sacred Heart Parish in Omaha" by Adam Fletcher Sasse for NorthOmahaHistory.com
Sacred Heart CUES, The Christian Urban Education Service is the non-profit organization that provides financial support and operational guidance for Sacred Heart School
Modern photo
Historic Postcard  - Nebraska Memories

Roman Catholic churches in Omaha, Nebraska
Landmarks in North Omaha, Nebraska
History of North Omaha, Nebraska
National Register of Historic Places in Omaha, Nebraska
African-American history in Omaha, Nebraska
Churches on the National Register of Historic Places in Nebraska